Samuel Henry Rambo (October 12, 1843 – October 10, 1920) was a United States businessman and Republican politician.

Rambo was born in Pennsylvania, and was brought up there and in Kansas. A logger and merchant, he served in the Eleventh Kansas Infantry during the American Civil War.  In 1878 he moved to California, where he lived first in Santa Clara and later in San Jose, finally settling in Boulder Creek.  He held numerous official positions, including Santa Cruz County Supervisor, State Senator, and the Head of Big Basin Park (later the first California State Park).

References

External links
Join California Samuel H. Rambo

1843 births
1920 deaths
Union Army soldiers
People from Santa Clara, California
People from San Jose, California
People from Boulder Creek, California
Republican Party California state senators
20th-century American politicians